The brook trout (Salvelinus fontinalis) is a species of freshwater fish in the char genus Salvelinus of the salmon family Salmonidae. It is native to Eastern North America in the United States and Canada, but has been introduced elsewhere in North America, as well as to Iceland, Europe, and Asia. In parts of its range, it is also known as the eastern brook trout, speckled trout, brook charr, squaretail, brookie or mud trout, among others. A potamodromous population in Lake Superior, as well as an anadromous population in Maine, is known as coaster trout or, simply, as coasters. The brook trout is the state fish of nine U.S. states: Michigan, New Hampshire, New Jersey, New York, North Carolina, Pennsylvania, Vermont, Virginia, and West Virginia, and the Provincial Fish of Nova Scotia in Canada.

Systematics and taxonomy
The brook trout was first scientifically described as Salmo fontinalis by the naturalist Samuel Latham Mitchill in 1814. The specific epithet "fontinalis" comes from the Latin for "of a spring or fountain", in reference to the clear, cold streams and ponds in its native habitat. The species was later moved to the char genus Salvelinus, which in North America also includes the lake trout, bull trout, Dolly Varden, and the Arctic char.

There is little recognized systematic substructure in the brook trout, but two subspecies have been proposed. On the other hand, three ecological forms are distinguished.

Subspecies
The aurora trout, S. f. timagamiensis, is a subspecies native to two lakes in the Temagami District of Ontario, Canada. The silver trout, (Salvelinus agassizii or S. f. agassizii), is an extinct trout species or subspecies last seen in Dublin Pond, New Hampshire, in 1930. It is considered by fisheries biologist Robert J. Behnke as a highly specialized form of brook trout.

Ecological forms
Robert J. Behnke describes three ecological forms of the brook trout. A large lake form evolved in the larger lakes in the northern reaches of its range and are generally piscivorous as adults. A sea-run form that migrates into saltwater for short periods to feed evolved along the Atlantic coastline. Finally, a smaller generalist form evolved in the small lakes, ponds, rivers, and streams throughout most of the native range. All three forms have the same general appearance.

Hybrids

The brook trout produces hybrids both with its congeners Salvelinus namaycush and Salvelinus alpinus, and intergeneric hybrids with Salmo trutta.

The splake is an intrageneric hybrid between the brook trout and lake trout (S. namaycush). Although uncommon in nature, they are artificially propagated in substantial numbers for stocking into brook trout or lake trout habitats. Although they are fertile, back-crossing in nature is behaviorally problematic and very little natural reproduction occurs. Splake grow more quickly than brook trout, become piscivorous sooner, and are more tolerant of competitors than brook trout.

The tiger trout is an intergeneric hybrid between the brook trout and the Eurasian brown trout (Salmo trutta). Tiger trout rarely occur naturally but are sometimes artificially propagated. Such crosses are almost always reproductively sterile. They are popular with many fish-stocking programs because they can grow quickly, and may help keep coarse fish (wild non "sport" fish) populations in check due to their highly piscivorous (fish-eating) nature.

The sparctic char is an intrageneric hybrid between the brook trout and the Arctic char (S. alpinus).

Description

The brook trout has a dark green to brown color, with a distinctive marbled pattern (called vermiculation) of lighter shades across the flanks and back and extending at least to the dorsal fin, and often to the tail. A distinctive sprinkling of red dots, surrounded by blue halos, occurs along the flanks. The belly and lower fins are reddish in color, the latter with white leading edges. Often, the belly, particularly of the males, becomes very red or orange when the fish are spawning.
Brook trout can reach at least seven years of age, with reports of 15-year-old specimens observed in California habitats to which the species has been introduced. Growth rates are dependent on season, age, water and ambient air temperatures, and flow rates. In general, flow rates affect the rate of change in the relationship between temperature and growth rate. For example, in spring, growth increased with temperature at a faster rate with high flow rates than with low flow rates.

Range and habitat

Brook trout are native to a wide area of Eastern North America, but are increasingly confined to higher elevations southward in the Appalachian Mountains to northern Georgia and northwest South Carolina, Canada from the Hudson Bay basin east, the Great Lakes–Saint Lawrence system, the Canadian maritime provinces, and the upper Mississippi River drainage as far west as eastern Iowa. Their southern historic native range has been drastically reduced, with fish being restricted to higher-elevation, remote streams due to habitat loss and introductions of brown and rainbow trout. As early as 1850, the brook trout's range started to extend west from its native range through introductions. The brook trout was eventually introduced into suitable habitats throughout the western U.S. during the late 19th and early 20th centuries at the behest of the American Acclimatization Society and by private, state, and federal fisheries authorities. Acclimatization movements in Europe, South America, and Oceania resulted in brook trout introductions throughout Europe, in Argentina, and New Zealand. Although not all introductions were successful, a great many established wild, self-sustaining populations of brook trout in non-native waters.

Habitat

The brook trout inhabits large and small lakes, rivers, streams, creeks, and spring ponds. They prefer clear waters of high purity and a narrow pH range and are sensitive to poor oxygenation, pollution, and changes in pH caused by environmental effects such as acid rain. The typical pH range of brook trout waters is 5.0 to 7.5, with pH extremes of 3.5 to 9.8 possible. Warm summer temperatures and low flow rates are stressful on brook trout populations—especially larger fish.

Coasters
A potamodromous population of brook trout native to Lake Superior, which migrate into tributary rivers to spawn, are called "coasters". Coasters tend to be larger than most other populations of brook trout, often reaching  in size. Many coaster populations have been severely reduced by overfishing and habitat loss by the construction of hydroelectric power dams on Lake Superior tributaries. In Ontario and Michigan, efforts are underway to restore and recover coaster populations.

Salters
When Europeans first settled in Eastern North America, semianadromous or sea-run brook trout, commonly called "salters", ranged from southern New Jersey, north throughout the Canadian maritime provinces, and west to Hudson Bay. Salters may spend up to three months at sea feeding on crustaceans, fish, and marine worms in the spring, not straying more than a few miles from the river mouth. The fish return to freshwater tributaries to spawn in the late summer or autumn. While in saltwater, salters gain a more silvery color, losing much of the distinctive markings seen in freshwater. However, within two weeks of returning to freshwater, they assume typical brook trout color and markings.

Ecology and reproduction

Diet
Brook trout have a diverse diet that includes larval, pupal, and adult forms of aquatic insects (typically caddisflies, stoneflies, mayflies, and aquatic dipterans), and adult forms of terrestrial insects (typically ants, beetles, grasshoppers, and crickets) that fall into the water, crustaceans, frogs and other amphibians, molluscs, smaller fish, invertebrates, and even small aquatic mammals such as voles and sometimes other young brook trout

Reproduction
The female constructs a depression in a location in the stream bed, sometimes referred to as a "redd", where groundwater percolates upward through the gravel. One or more males approach the female, fertilizing the eggs as the female expresses them. Most spawnings involve peripheral males, which directly influences the number of eggs that survive into adulthood. In general, the larger the number of peripheral males present, the more likely the eggs will be cannibalized. The eggs are slightly denser than water. The female then buries the eggs in a small gravel mound; they hatch in 95 to 100 days.

Angling
The brook trout is a popular game fish with anglers, particularly fly fishermen. 
 Until it was displaced by introduced brown trout (1883) and rainbow trout (1875), the brook trout attracted the most attention of anglers from colonial times through the first 100 years of U.S. history. Sporting writers such as Genio Scott Fishing in American Waters (1869), Thaddeus Norris American Anglers Book (1864), Robert Barnwell Roosevelt Game Fish of North America (1864) and Charles Hallock The Fishing Tourist (1873) produced guides to the best-known brook trout waters in America. As brook trout populations declined in the mid-19th century near urban areas, anglers flocked to the Adirondacks in upstate New York and the Rangeley lakes region in Maine to pursue brook trout. In July 1916 on the Nipigon River in northern Ontario, an Ontario physician, John W. Cook, caught a  brook trout, which stands as the world record.

Today, many anglers practice catch-and-release tactics to preserve remaining populations. Organizations such as Trout Unlimited have been at the forefront of efforts to institute air and water quality standards sufficient to protect the brook trout. Revenues derived from the sale of fishing licenses have been used to restore many sections of creeks and streams to brook trout habitat.

The current world angling record brook trout was caught by Dr. W. J. Cook on the Nipigon River, Ontario, in July 1915. The  trout weighed only  because, at the time of weighing, it was badly decomposed after 21 days in the bush without refrigeration. A  brook trout, caught in October 2006 in Manitoba, is not eligible for record status since it was released alive. This trout weighed about  based on the accepted formula for calculating weight by measurements, and it currently stands as the record brook trout for Manitoba.

Artificial propagation and aquaculture
Brook trout are also commercially raised in large numbers for food production, being sold for human consumption in both fresh and smoked forms. Because of its dependence on pure water and a variety of aquatic and insect life forms, the brook trout is also used for scientific experimentation in assessing the effects of pollution and contaminated waters.

Brook trout are also raised commercially and sold to angling organizations or groups to stock their lakes or ponds. Some businesses hold a "U-fish license" where the public can fish at their lake or pond and buy the fish they catch.

Commercial fisheries do not commonly raise brook trout because they do not grow as fast as other types of fish.

Brook trout raised commercially are often kept in large circular tanks with a constant water flow going through them. This allows for a current to circulate through the tank and keep it clean, acting as a flush of water that takes fish waste with it. Some more elaborate systems operate on a re-circulation system where the water is filtered and reused.

The fish are typically fed a pelleted food consisting of 40–50% protein and 15% fat. The fish food is usually made from fish oil, animal protein, plant protein and vitamins and minerals. The protein is often sourced from soy beans.

Conservation status
Brook trout populations depend on cold, clear, well-oxygenated water of high purity. As early as the late 19th century, native brook trout in North America became extirpated from many watercourses as land development, forest clear-cutting, and industrialization took hold. Streams and creeks that were polluted, dammed, or silted up often became too warm to hold native brook trout, and were colonized by transplanted smallmouth bass and perch or other introduced salmonids such as brown and rainbow trout. The brown trout, a species not native to North America, has replaced the brook trout in much of the brook trout's native water. If already stressed by overharvesting or by temperature, brook trout populations are very susceptible to damage by the introduction of exogenous species. Many lacustrine populations of brook trout have been extirpated by the introduction of other species, particularly percids, but sometimes other spiny-rayed fishes.

In addition to chemical pollution and algae growth caused by runoff containing chemicals and fertilizers, air pollution has also been a significant factor in the disappearance of brook trout from their native habitats. In the U.S., acid rain caused by air pollution has resulted in pH levels too low to sustain brook trout in all but the highest headwaters of some Appalachian streams and creeks. Brook trout populations across large parts of eastern Canada have been similarly challenged; a subspecies known as the aurora trout was extirpated from the wild by the effects of acid rain. Today, in many parts of the range, efforts are underway to restore brook trout to those waters that once held native populations, stocking other trout species only in habitats that can no longer be recovered sufficiently to sustain brook trout populations.

Organizations such as Trout Unlimited and Trout Unlimited Canada are partnering with other organizations such as the Southern Appalachian Brook Trout Foundation, the Eastern Brook Trout Joint Venture, and state, provincial, and federal agencies to undertake projects that restore native brook trout habitat and populations.

As an invasive species
Although brook trout populations are under stress in their native range, they are considered an invasive species where they have been introduced outside their historic native range. In the northern Rocky Mountains, non-native brook trout are considered a significant contributor to the decline or extirpation of native cutthroat trout (Oncorhynchus clarki) in headwater streams. Non-native brook trout populations have been subject to eradication programs in efforts to preserve native species. In Yellowstone National Park, anglers may take an unlimited number of non-native brook trout in some watersheds. In the Lamar River watershed, a mandatory kill regulation for any brook trout caught is in effect. In Europe, introduced brook trout, once established, have had negative impacts on growth rates of native brown trout (S. trutta).

References

Further reading

 
 
 
 
 
 
 
 
 
 
 

brook trout
Freshwater fish of North America
Fish of the Eastern United States
Fish of the Great Lakes
Ecology of the Appalachian Mountains
Symbols of Michigan
Symbols of Pennsylvania
Symbols of New Hampshire
Symbols of New Jersey
Symbols of New York (state)
Symbols of North Carolina
Symbols of Vermont
Symbols of Virginia
Symbols of West Virginia
Vermont cuisine
brook trout
brook trout